Ariane Next—also known as SALTO (reuSable strAtegic space Launcher Technologies & Operations—is the code name for a future European Space Agency rocket being developed in the 2020s by ArianeGroup. This partially reusable launcher is planned to succeed Ariane 6, with an entry into service in the 2030s. The objective of the new launcher is to halve the launch costs compared with Ariane 6. The preferred architecture is that of the Falcon 9 rocket (a reusable first stage landing vertically with a common engine model for the two stages) while using an engine burning a mixture of methane and liquid oxygen. The first technological demonstrators are under development.

History 
The European Space Agency's Ariane 6 launcher is to gradually succeed the Ariane 5 rocket after 2023. Studies on the next generation of European government-funded launcher to follow Ariane 6 started before 2019. The stated priority objective for the new rocket is to halve the cost of launching compared to Ariane 6 with simplified and more flexible launch methods.

ArianeGroup was selected by the ESA in 2021 to head two projects: one to develop a new reusable launch vehicle and the other to develop a new liquid propellant rocket engine for the vehicle.  More specifically, the two programmes were named "SALTO (reuSable strAtegic space Launcher Technologies & Operations) and ENLIGHTEN (European iNitiative for Low cost, Innovative & Green High Thrust Engine) projects," respectively.

ArianeGroup secured funding to begin development of the new reusable launch vehicle in May 2022.
Funding for the project will be provided "by the European Commission as a part of the Horizon Europe programme designed to encourage and accelerate innovation" in Europe.

In May 2022, the "French Economy Minister Bruno Le Maire said SALTO and ENLIGHTEN would be operational by 2026", and ArianeGroup stated that the target date was achievable.  
As of May 2022, the SALTO project intended to carry out an initial flight test of a single rocket stage by mid-2024, using a Themis prototype first stage to validate the landing phase of the design.

Description 
The architecture proposed for Ariane Next uses the formula developed by SpaceX with its Falcon 9 launcher: a reusable first stage which, after having separated from the second stage, returns to land vertically on Earth. The first stage will use several liquid-propellant rocket engines: the predecessor for these is the Prometheus rocket engine under development by the EU, which burns a mixture of methane and liquid oxygen. The density of liquid methane is higher than hydrogen, which allows a mass reduction in the tank structure. The launcher is planned to use seven or nine of such engines for the first stage and a single engine for the second stage. The goal is to halve the launch costs compared to Ariane 6.

Preliminary steps 
To be able to produce the new launcher, various technology demonstrators are being developed, each also funded by European Union technology development funds:
 FROG is a small demonstrator for testing the vertical landing of a rocket stage. It made several flights in 2019.
 Callisto, under development, aims to improve the techniques required to produce a reusable launcher (return to Earth and reconditioning) and to estimate the operational cost of such a launcher. A first flight is scheduled for 2022.
 Themis will then be developed. It will have a reusable first stage with one to three Prometheus rocket motors and is expected to fly around 2022–2025.

Configurations 
Different configurations of the launcher are being evaluated. Three versions are under consideration for different missions:
 A two-stage version
 A version with two small liquid propellant boosters
 A version with three first stages linked together, similar to Falcon Heavy

Return to Earth 
Different systems are being studied for controlling the first stage's atmospheric re-entry:
 Grid fins, as on the first stage of Falcon 9
 Stabilization fins
 Air braking

Landing system 
Different systems are being considered, ranging from everything on ground (all ground systems) to everything on the launcher (all on-board systems). Currently, development is focused on an on-board legs system similar to that of Falcon 9.

See also 
 Reusable launch system
 Reusable Vehicle Testing
 Falcon 9

References

External links 
 Ariane Next on CNES website

Reusable launch systems
Partially reusable space launch vehicles
Proposed space launch vehicles
Space launch vehicles of Europe
Ariane (rocket family)
Space programs
European space programmes
Spaceflight technology